The Review of International Studies is a peer-reviewed academic journal on international relations published by Cambridge University Press on behalf of the British International Studies Association. From 1975-1980, it was known as the British Journal of International Studies. The editor-in-chief is Martin Coward (University of Manchester). Previous editors include J. E. Spence, Roy E. Jones, R. J. Vincent, Richard Little, Paul Taylor, Michael Cox, David Armstrong, Nicholas Rengger, Kimberly Hutchings, and Ruth Blakeley.

According to the Journal Citation Reports, the journal has a 2015 impact factor of 1.309, ranking it 21st out of 86 journals in the category "International Relations".

See also
List of international relations journals

References

External links

International relations journals
Publications established in 1975
Cambridge University Press academic journals
English-language journals
Academic journals associated with learned and professional societies
5 times per year journals